Ninjas in Pyjamas (NIP) is a professional esports organisation based in Sweden that is best known for its Counter-Strike teams. In 2012, the team reformed with a Counter Strike: Global Offensive lineup upon the release of the game. Aside from Counter-Strike, the organisation has teams in Valorant, Rainbow Six Siege, FIFA, and League of Legends. They formerly had teams in Fortnite Battle Royale, Overwatch, PlayerUnknown's Battlegrounds and Paladins.

History 

Ninjas in Pyjamas were formed in June 2000. Their biggest success was winning the 2001 Cyberathlete Professional League World Championships after an extremely close final with X3 (a forerunner to Team 3D). Ninjas in Pyjamas struggled to find a sponsor, and as a result, joined the prominent esports organization SK Gaming and were known by the names SK Scandinavia and later SK Sweden. At SK, they continued their success. The prize money from their tournament victories in 2003 totalled approximately US$170,000, and every CPL event that year.

Feeling they could secure a larger share of sponsorship money, the team left SK in early 2005. Later in the year, some members returned to SK Gaming, forcing NIP to replace them.

Emil Christensen with Tommy Ingemarsson, Managing Directors Peter Hedlund and Victor Lindqvist reformed NIP as a Swedish stock company in 2005, due to problems with SK. NIP continued to participate in international tournaments, placing high in many events. They signed some of the biggest sponsorship deals in the scene at that time. The team received about 100,000 members on their website in Europe during their first two years and was also the first team outside of Asia to enter the Asian market. Within six months, they had about 90,000 members on their Asian website. The team was among the most outspoken opponents to the change from the original version of Counter-Strike to the newer Counter-Strike: Source.

On 13 November 2015, NIP's parted ways with its Dota 2 team, consisting of Elias 'Sealkid' Merta, Jonas 'Jonassomfan' Lindholm, Adrian 'Era' Kryeziu, Simon 'Handsken' Haag and Linus 'Limmp' Blomdin. The cited reason was disappointment over recent performances, as the team had failed to qualify for both The International 2015 and Frankfurt Major. Since then, NIP have had two Dota 2 teams, one formed in 2017 that disbanded later that year, as well as another formation in 2018. Christopher "GeT RiGhT" Alesund, one of the original 2012 NIP roster, left after the StarLadder Major Berlin 2019, being replaced by Simon "twist" Eliasson, a former player for Fnatic, and leaving f0rest as the only remaining member of the original roster, until he left in 2020 to come back to the 2014 NIP roster on Dignitas.

In July 2020, it was announced that NIP would be merging with Chinese esports organization Victory Five.

Ninjas in Pajamas won RLCS 2022-23 - Winter: South America Regional 3 - Winter Invitational

Rosters

References

External links
 Official website

2000 establishments in Sweden
Esports teams based in Sweden
Esports teams established in 2000
Esports teams disestablished in 2007
Esports teams established in 2012
Counter-Strike teams
Privately held companies of Sweden
Defunct and inactive Overwatch teams
Dota teams
Former European League of Legends Championship Series teams
Tom Clancy's Rainbow Six Siege teams
2007 disestablishments in Sweden
The Game Awards winners